Pothnal is a village in the Manvi taluk of Raichur district in the Indian state of Karnataka.
Pothnal is well connected by road and it lies on Karnataka State highway 23. Pothnal is 22 km from Manvi and 24 km from Sindhanur. it is a well developing village because it lies on the bank of a nala called pothnal nala. it has nearly 10 schools and two three pu and degree colleges. and also has diploma college. HUCHCHABUDDESHWARA temple is very famous and it has jatra in every August. Nearest major railway station is in Raichur.pothnal has two NGO's one is vimukthi charitable trust and one is Navanirmana trust.

Demographics
As of 2011 India census, Pothnal had a population of 6,575 with 3,289 males and 3,286 females and 1,312 Households.

Pothnal has one of the famous and popular fertiliser shop named as SRI LAKSHMIVENKATESHWARA AGRO KENDRA JEENUR ROAD POTHNAL, owned and managed by Mr.Virupakshigowda Bhumareddy.

See also
 Manvi
 Sindhanur
 Lingasugur
 Raichur
 Karnataka
 India

References

Villages in Raichur district